Karl Girolamo (born February 1, 1986) is an American short actor, writer, certified lifeguard and producer.

Early life
Girolamo was born February 1, 1986 in Staten Island, New York. He attended the Freehold Regional Fine and Performing Arts High School in Howell, New Jersey, and received his Bachelor of Fine Arts in Acting at Montclair State University. In 2018, Karl Girolamo married Cuban-American Alissa Garcia. Karl and his wife reside in Los Angeles, CA.

Career
Girolamo's first major recurring television role was in As the World Turns as Kevin Davis and his film debut was in Gracie as Curt. Recent work of Karl includes Marvel's Agents of Shield as Chip Womack (2020) and the upcoming (2021) Hulu Mini series Pam & Tommy as Dick Gautier. Karl's film work includes The Phoenix Incident, as well as numerous short films including Head Over Heels and The Good Ones.

Filmography

References

1986 births
Living people
American actors
Howell High School (New Jersey) alumni
People from Staten Island